Starksia grammilaga, the pinstriped blenny, is a species of labrisomid blenny native to the Pacific coast of Mexico including the Gulf of California.

References

grammilaga
Fish described in 1971
Taxa named by Richard Heinrich Rosenblatt